is a passenger railway station located in the city of Misato, Saitama Prefecture, Japan operated by the third-sector railway operating company Metropolitan Intercity Railway Company. The station is numbered TX09.

Lines

Station layout
The station consists of two elevated opposed side platforms with the station building located underneath.

Platforms

History
The station opened on 24 August 2005, coinciding with the opening of the Tsukuba Express line.

Passenger statistics
In fiscal 2019, the station was used by 15,413 passengers (boarding passengers only).

Surrounding area
 Misato Central General Hospital
 Odori Park
Misato City Fire Department
Misato Post Office
Misato City Shinwa Elementary School

See also
 List of railway stations in Japan

References

External links

 TX Misato-chūō Station 

Railway stations in Japan opened in 2005
Railway stations in Saitama Prefecture
Stations of Tsukuba Express
Misato, Saitama (city)